Gelis is a genus of ichneumon wasps in the family Ichneumonidae. There are at least 270 described species in Gelis.

See also
 List of Gelis species

References

Further reading

External links

 

Parasitic wasps
Ichneumonidae